Loracarbef is an antibiotic. It is a carbacephem, but it is sometimes grouped together with the second-generation cephalosporin antibiotics. Loracarbef is a synthetic "carba" analog of cefaclor, and is more stable.

History
Loracarbef received FDA approval in 1991 and it was marketed under the trade name Lorabid.  Its use was discontinued in 2006.

Usage & Indications 
Loracarbef was used to treat infections of the lungs, maxillary sinuses, throat, skin, and urinary tract.

Spectrum of Activity 
Loracarbef had broad spectrum effectiveness against both gram-negative and gram-positive bacteria, including those precipitating infections of the respiratory tract, sinuses, tonsils, skin, urinary tract, and kidneys. It was of specific use in those infections caused by E. Coli, S. pyogenes, S. Aureus, S. saprphyticus, S. penumoniae, H. influenza, and M. catarrhalis.

Side effects
Diarrhea is the most common adverse effect with loracarbef. Side effects are more frequently seen with children under the age of twelve.

References

External links 
 RxList.com - Loracarbef

Cephalosporin antibiotics
Organochlorides